Wisełka  (German Neuendorf) is a village in the administrative district of Gmina Wolin, within Kamień County, West Pomeranian Voivodeship, in north-western Poland.

As of 2006 the village has a population of 480.

References

External links
 Matthias Blazek: „Wisełka (Wolin)“, matthias-blazek.eu (German)
 Wisełka – Informator Turystyczny, wiselka.info.pl (Polish)

Villages in Kamień County